This list of belemnite genera is an attempt to create a comprehensive listing of all genera that have ever been included in the extinct subclass Belemnoidea, excluding purely vernacular terms. The list includes all commonly accepted genera, as well as genera that are now considered invalid, doubtful (nomina dubia), or were not formally published (nomina nuda), as well as junior synonyms of more established names, and genera that are no longer considered belemites. Naming conventions and terminology follow the International Code of Zoological Nomenclature as indicated. 

The list currently contains 100 generic names.

List of belemnites

See also 

 Belemnoidea
 List of ammonites
 List of nautiloids

References 

Uncited genera names can be verified at:
Sepkoski, J.J. Jr. 2002. A compendium of fossil marine animal genera. Bulletins of American Paleontology 363: 1–560. Sepkoski's Online Genus Database, Cephalopoda entry

Prehistoric cephalopod genera
Lists of prehistoric molluscs
Lists of animal genera (alphabetic)
Cenozoic cephalopods
Mesozoic cephalopods